Radiation City was an American indie rock band that began in Portland, Oregon, in 2010. The band consisted of Cameron Spies (guitar, vocals), Elisabeth Ellison  (vocals, keyboards), Randy Bemrose (drums, vocals), Matt Rafferty (bass, vocals), and Patti King (vocals, keys, bass). There were two couples in the band.  The band released four albums: Cool Nightmare, The Hands That Take You, Animals in the Median, and Synesthetica.
The band was signed to the Polyvinyl Record Co. label.

History 

Radiation City was initially composed of Lizzy Ellison and her boyfriend Cameron Spies, adding drummer Randy Bemrose for their second show, and bassist Matt Rafferty for their third. Their debut album The Hands That Take You was originally released in February 2011 on Ellison and Spies own cassette-only label Apes Tapes. After garnering interest through their live shows, they were picked up by the record label Tender Loving Empire and the album was re-released nationally on September 27, 2011. Time called this debut release "charmingly evocative". After the addition of multi-instrumentalist Patti King they followed their debut up with the Cool Nightmare EP released on April 10, 2012. A music video was recorded for the song "Find it of Use" from this release.  Their second full-length album, Animals in the Median was released on May 21, 2013 to positive reviews. In 2015, Radiation City signed to Polyvinyl Record Co. and announced their third full-length album, Synesthetica. The album was released on February 12, 2016.

The band broke up in November 2016.

On June 22, 2018, the band released a final 6-track EP titled Coda.

Discography

Studio albums

Extended plays

References

External links 
 
 

Musical groups from Portland, Oregon
2010 establishments in Oregon
Musical groups established in 2010